Czarnca  is a village in the administrative district of Gmina Włoszczowa, within Włoszczowa County, Świętokrzyskie Voivodeship, in south-central Poland. The village has a population of 730.

Historically, the town is connected to the Czarniecki family of the Łodzia coat of arms dating back to 1184. At present, a 17th-century church is located in the village.  It is the site of burial of famous Polish military commander, 17th-century hetman Stefan Czarniecki, who was born in the village and funded the construction of the church.

References

Czarnca